SPLP may refer to:
Surat Perjalanan Laksana Paspor, type of Indonesian travel document
Specialty Paper, Indian paper company listed on NSE with the ticker symbol SPLP
Las Palmas Air Base, Lima, Peru (ICAO abbreviation)
Synthetic precipitation leaching procedure; see Leaching (Chemistry)